The Anniston Defense Munitions Center (ADMC) located at Anniston Army Depot in Bynum, Alabama, is a multi-functional ammunition facility under the  US Army Joint Munitions Command..  The primary mission is receipt, storage, surveillance and shipment of missiles and conventional ammunition.  The ADMC is the site of the Department of Army’s only Missile Recycling Center and is one of the Army’s premium ammunition storage sites because it is capable of storing some of the Army’s largest munitions.

Capabilities
Capabilities of the center include:  ammunition renovation; shipping, receiving, outloading; preservation, packaging and maintenance; quality assurance; explosive demilitarization; and missile recycling.

History
Anniston Ordnance Depot was established in February 1941. In 1952, the depot was assigned a maintenance mission for the overhaul and repair of combat vehicles. In 1962, the installation was renamed Anniston Army Depot and became part of the Army Materiel Command. In 1976, Anniston Army Depot became a part of the U.S. Army Depot System Command. In 1995, it became part of the Industrial Operations Command. In 1998, the 722nd Ordnance Company relocated from Fort McClellan, Ala. to Anniston Army
Depot under Base Realignment and Closure 1995. Also in 1998, the conventional ammunition mission became a tenant organization function of the newly established Anniston Munitions Center. In 2004, the name was changed to the Anniston Defense Munitions Center. Oct. 1, 1999, ADMC officially came under the full command and control of Blue Grass Army Depot in Richmond, Ky. ADMC received its first on-site commander in June 2004.

Facilities

Information compiled from

External links
Anniston Munitions Center website
Joint Munitions Command website

Buildings and structures in Calhoun County, Alabama
Industrial installations of the United States Army
United States Army logistics installations